This is a list of Italian television related events from 2014.

Events
26 May - Micro Petrilli wins the thirteenth season of Grande Fratello.
5 June - Cristina Scuccia wins the second season of The Voice of Italy.
6 December - Racewalker Giusy Versace and her partner Raimondo Todaro win the tenth season of Ballando con le stelle.
11 December - Lorenzo Fragola wins the eighth season of X Factor.

Debuts

RAI

Serials 

 Purché finisca bene (As long as it ends well) – by Fabrizio Costa and others; 4 seasons. It is a cycle of comedies, without recurring actors or characters, inspired by optimism and good feelings, also when treating serious matters, as the economic crisis.
 Braccialetti rossi (Red bracelets) – by Giacomo Campiotti, with Carmine Buschini and Aurora Ruffino, Italian version of the Spanish Polseres vermelles; 3 seasons. 
Una pallottola nel cuore (A bullet in the heart) – by Luca Manfredi, with Gigi Proietti and Francesca Inaudi; 3 seasons. Proietti is Bruno Palmieri, a crime reporter, active and brave also if, after an attempted murder, he lives with a bullet in the chest.

Television shows

RAI

Drama 

 Beauty and the beast, by Fabrizio Costa, with Bianca Suarez and Alessandro Preziosi, from the homonymous fable; 2 episodes.

Biopic 
 Per amore del mio popolo (For my people’s love) – biopic by Antonio Frazzi, with Alessandro Preziosi as don Giuseppe Diana; 2 episodes.
 Qualunque cosa succeda – (Whenever it happens) biopic by Albeto Negrin, with Pierfrancesco Favino as Giorgio Ambrosoli.
Mister Ignis, l’operaio che fondò un impero (Mister Ignis, the laborer who founded an empire) – biopic by Luciano Manuzzi, with Lorenzo Flaherty as the domestic appliance tycoon Giovanni Borghi; 2 episodes.
La strada dritta (The straight road) by Carmine Elia, with Ennio Fantastichini as Giuseppe Cova (the engineer who designed the Sun Motorway) and Anita Caprioli; 2 episodes.

Miniseries 

 Un’altra vita (Another life) – by Cinzia TH Torrini, with Vanessa Incontrada and Daniele Lotti; 6 episodes. An upper class woman, whose existence has been upset by her husband’s arrest, tries to rebuild a life as medical officer in Ponza.
Orfani (Orphans) – cartoon by Armando Traverso, from the Roberto Recchioni and Emiliano Mammucari’s comics; 10 episodes. In an apocalyptic future, a commando of children fights against the aliens invaders.

Serials 
Impazienti (The impatient ones) – sit-com by Celeste Laudisio, with Enrico Bertolino and Max Tortora. Two crocks, for an insurance scam, are forced to a long cohabitation in an hospital, even though they can't stand each other.
Il candidato – Zucca presidente (The candidate – Zucca for president), sit-com by Ludovico Bassegato, with Filippo Timi, Lunetta Savino and Bebo Storti; 2 seasons. Italian version of the French Hènaut prèsident, it’s the story of a postman become politician, honest but absolutely incompetent, and handled by his cynical staff.

News and educationals. 
Alla scoperta del Vaticano (Discovering the Vatican City) – by Alberto Angela; 6 episodes.

2000s
Grande Fratello (2000–present)
Ballando con le stelle (2005–present)
X Factor (2008–present)

2010s
Italia's Got Talent (2010–present)
The Voice of Italy (2013–present)

Ending this year

Births

Deaths

See also
2014 in Italy
List of Italian films of 2014

References